Ohn Maung (2 February 1913 – 19 July 1947) was a Burmese politician who served as the Deputy Minister of Transport in Myanmar's pre-independence government. He, along with seven other cabinet ministers (including Prime Minister Aung San), was assassinated on 19 July 1947 in Yangon. 19 July is commemorated each year as the Martyrs' Day in Myanmar.

References

Assassinated Burmese politicians
1913 births
1947 deaths
People from Magway Division
University of Yangon alumni
People murdered in Myanmar
Anti-Fascist People's Freedom League politicians
Government ministers of Myanmar
Deaths by firearm in Myanmar